John George Knight (18 August 1902 – 1990) was an English footballer who played for Casuals, Corinthian and Tottenham Hotspur.

Football career 
He played for the "Amateurs" in the 1929 FA Charity Shield. After playing for the Casuals and the Corinthians, Knight joined Tottenham Hotspur. The centre half played one match in 1928 for the Spurs.

He was also the Head of the Chemistry Department at Haberdashers' Aske's Boys' School, Hampstead (then Elstree from 1961) where he used to tell his pupils that he was the last amateur to play for Spurs.

References 

1902 births
1990 deaths
Footballers from Edmonton, London
English footballers
English Football League players
Casuals F.C. players
Corinthian F.C. players
Tottenham Hotspur F.C. players
Association football central defenders